Remigiose Inchananiyil (born 26 July 1961) is a Syro-Malabar Catholic bishop. He is the fourth Bishop of the Diocese of Thamarassery.

Biography
He was born on 26 July 1961 at Vettilappara, in Malappuram district. His parents Inchananiyil Paul and Rosamma migrated to Malabar in the year 1959. Remigiose has six brothers and a sister.

He had his primary education at Vettilappara L.P. School and Moorkkanad U.P.School. Having completed his high school education at Areacode, he joined St. Joseph's Minor Seminary, Tellichery for priestly formation. He did his philosophical and theological studies at St. Thomas Apostolic Seminary, Vadavathoor, Kottayam.

He was ordained priest for the eparchy of Thamarassery by Bishop Sebastian Mankuzhikary on 26 December 1987. He was appointed as secretary to the bishop and then he was given a mission as the parish priest of St. Mary's Church, Abhayagiri, Valayam in 1988. Then he was sent for his licentiate in canon law in Bangalore. In the year 1991 he was appointed as the vice rector and assistant judicial vicar and in 1992, vice chancellor of the diocese. In 1993 he was appointed the parish priest of St. George's Church, Thalayad and then to St. Thomas Church, Theyyappara. In 1996 he was appointed at St. Sebastian's Church, Karingad as vicar.  Meanwhile, he secured a master's degree in English Literature. In 1997 he went for Rome for higher studies and secured doctorate in canon law from Holy Cross University in 2000. Returning to the eparchy he served as Bishop's Secretary,  Chancellor and Consultor of the Eparchy, Secretary  of the Presbyteral Council, Secretary of Priest Provident Fund and General Secretary of the Pastoral Council from 2000. He was the judicial vicar of the eparchy from 2006.

In the year 2010 Remigius Maria Paul Inchananiyil was elected as the fourth bishop of the eparchy of Thamarassery on 18 January 2010 receiving the name Mar Remigiose Inchananiyil. On 8 April 2010 he was consecrated the Bishop of Thamarassery by Archbishop George Valiamattom and then he took charge of the eparchy. He received the motto 'to be rooted and founded in love' (Eph.3:17) as the guiding principle for his pastoral mission.

See also
Sacred Heart Forane Church, Thiruvambady

References

External links
http://www.catholic-hierarchy.org/bishop/binchan.html
http://www.inchananiyil.com
https://web.archive.org/web/20120425112442/http://www.dioceseofthamarassery.org/bishops.php?viewid=42

1961 births
Living people
People from Malappuram
Syro-Malabar bishops